Natalya Gurova (née Kovalenko; born 14 August 1976) is a female Kazakhstani sports shooter.

References
 Natalya Gurova at the International Shooting Sport Federation

1976 births
Living people
Kazakhstani female sport shooters
Running target shooters
Asian Games medalists in shooting
Shooters at the 2002 Asian Games
Shooters at the 2006 Asian Games
Shooters at the 2010 Asian Games
Shooters at the 2014 Asian Games
Asian Games gold medalists for Kazakhstan
Asian Games silver medalists for Kazakhstan

Medalists at the 2002 Asian Games
Medalists at the 2006 Asian Games
21st-century Kazakhstani women